Erik Bosgraaf (born 9 May 1980) is a Dutch recorder player and musicologist.

Early life
Bosgraaf was born in Drachten, Netherlands. He received his Master of Arts in musicology from Utrecht University in 2006. In 2007 Bosgraaf, under the supervision of musicologist Thiemo Wind, released a 3-CD-box with compositions of the Dutch composer Jacob van Eyck (1589–1657), a collection which attained unexpected commercial success and sold more than 25,000 copies. In the 2011–12 season he was nominated by Concertgebouw Amsterdam and the Centre for Fine Arts, Brussels, on behalf of the German ECHO music award organisation, to take part in the Rising Stars series for a tour of the most important concert halls in Europe.

Career as musician

Ensemble Cordevento
In 2005 Bosgraaf, guitarist Izhar Elias and Italian harpsichord player Alessandro Pianu founded the ensemble Cordevento. The trio at first focused mainly on 17th-century music, then, under the same name Cordevento, the ensemble from 2008 also works as a small baroque orchestra in single strength. In this broad formation the ensemble mainly aims at 18th-century repertoire. The first CD, featuring recorder concertos by Antonio Vivaldi, was released in 2009. A CD featuring recorder transcriptions of concertos by Johann Sebastian Bach was released in 2011, and an album title La Monarcha was released in 2012.

As a soloist with orchestras
Beside his activities in chamber music Bosgraaf frequents the orchestral stage with symphony and chamber orchestras. He has worked with the Dallas Symphony Orchestra (Jaap van Zweden), Netherlands Kamerorkest (Gordan Nikolić), Residentie Orchestra (Reinbert de Leeuw), Holland Symfonia (Otto Tausk), The North-Netherlands Orchestra (Johannes Leertouwer), Dutch Radio Chamber Philharmonic, (Thierry Fischer Andreas Delfs) and Sinfonia Rotterdam (Alessandro Crudele). He often plays a mixture of early and more recent music with these orchestras.  He has also performed with The Royal Wind Music. Bosgraaf made a transcription of Pierre Boulez' Dialogue de l'ombre double which was authorized by the composer. It was released in 2015.

Musical awards
In 2009 Bosgraaf received a Borletti-Buitoni Trust Award which enabled him amongst others to purchase a set of special recorders. In 2009 Erik and Izhar were awarded the Amsterdam Canal Festival Award. In 2011 Erik Bosgraaf received the most prestigious Dutch Music Prize, the highest national prize for music. He was also awarded the 'Golden Violin' Prize, a prize given triennially to a classical artist who has made outstanding contributions to the classical music scene of the northern Netherlands.

Discography
 Loevendie and Bosgraaf: Nachklang - Reflex - Dance - Improvisations (Brilliant Classics 95906), 2018
 Telemann: The Trio Sonatas for Recorder, Violin & Basso Continuo (Berlin Classics 0301006BC), 2017
 Ernst Reijseger: Walking Out, soundtrack for the movie by Andrew & Alex Smith (Winter & Winter), 2017
 Telemann: The Double Concertos with Recorder, Cordevento (Brilliant Classics 95249), 2016
 Telemann: Complete Suites and Concertos for Recorder, Cordevento (Brilliant Classics 95248), 2016
 Ernst Reijseger: Salt & Fire, soundtrack for the movie by Werner Herzog (Winter & Winter, 2016)
 Willem Jeths: Recorder Concerto (Challenge Records CC 72693), 2015
 Telemann: The Recorder Sonatas (Brilliant Classics 95247), 2015
 Pierre Boulez, Tamminga/Bosgraaf: Dialogues, Dialogue de l'ombre double (Brilliant Classics 94842), 2015
 Vivaldi: The Four Seasons, Cordevento (Brilliant Classics 94637), 2013, re-release on LP 2015
 Hotel Terminus, met Saxophonist Yuri Honing (Brilliant Classics 9418), 2013
 La Monarcha, 17th century music from the Spanish territories, Cordevento (Brilliant Classics, 94252), 2012
 Bach: Concerti, Cordevento (Brilliant Classics 94296), 2011
 Vivaldi: Recorder Concertos, Cordevento (Brilliant Classics 93804), 2009
 Handel: The Recorder Sonatas (Brilliant Classics 93792), 2008
 Telemann: Twelve Fantasias, Bach: Partita (Brilliant Classics 93757), 2008
 Van Eyck: Der Fluyten Lust-hof (3-CD-set, Brilliant Classics 93391), 2007
 Big Eye, movies & music (CD & DVD, Phenom Records PH0713), 2007

References

External links
 Official website
 Gramophone.co.uk
Appearance in film music by Ernst Reijseger:
 Werner Herzog: Salt_and_Fire (premiered in Shanghai, 2016): https://www.imdb.com/title/tt4441150/
 Alex & Andrew Smith: Walking_Out (2017): https://www.imdb.com/title/tt5420886/?ref_=fn_al_tt_1
 Werner Herzog: Nomad: in the footsteps of Bruce Chatwin (premiered in New York, 2019): https://www.imdb.com/title/tt10011296/?ref_=nv_sr_1?ref_=nv_sr_1
 Werner Herzog: Family Romance, LLC (premiered in Cannes, 2019): https://www.imdb.com/title/tt10208194/

1980 births
Living people
Dutch recorder players
Dutch classical musicians
People from Drachten
Utrecht University alumni